George Washington, also known as the President George Washington Monument, is a bronze sculpture of George Washington by Lorado Taft, installed at the University of Washington campus in Seattle's University District, in the U.S. state of Washington.

History
The statue was dedicated on Flag Day, June 14, 1909, during the Alaska–Yukon–Pacific Exposition. The pedestal had been designed by Taft in 1908 but was not funded in time for the exposition.

Calls for removal 
A number of student led organizations at the University of Washington have called for the statue's removal. Most notably, the Black Student Union and the Black Lives Matter coalition (UW BLM) have publicly spoken out against the statue. UW BLM staged a month-long protest of the statue in August 2020, spray-painting the statue every day to induce a response from the administration. As of October 16, 2020 there has been no response from university officials regarding the removal of the statue.

The university's student newspaper has also called for the removal of the statue in an op-ed, noting that a petition to remove the statue has reached over 3,000 signatures. This petition is asking for the George Washington statue to be replaced with a Black Power fist and to rename the cafe near the statue from the By George Cafe to the Juneteenth Cafe. According to a 2021 poll, conducted by King5 News, that surveyed 650 Washingtonians, only 29% wanted the statue removed, 59% wanted the statue to remain, and 11% weren't sure.

See also

 1909 in art
 Campus of the University of Washington
 Cultural depictions of George Washington
 List of monuments dedicated to George Washington
 List of sculptures of presidents of the United States
 List of statues of George Washington
 List of the tallest statues in the United States

References

External links

 George Washington Statue, University of Washington – Seattle, WA at Waymarking

1909 establishments in Washington (state)
1909 sculptures
Bronze sculptures in Washington (state)
Monuments and memorials in Seattle
Monuments and memorials to George Washington in the United States
Outdoor sculptures in Seattle
Sculptures by Lorado Taft
Sculptures of men in Washington (state)
Statues in Seattle
Statues of George Washington
University of Washington campus
Vandalized works of art in Washington (state)
Works Progress Administration in Washington (state)
World's fair sculptures
Alaska–Yukon–Pacific Exposition